Martin Simpson   was an American professional baseball player, who played in four games during the   season for the Baltimore Marylands.

References

External links

Major League Baseball infielders
Baltimore Marylands players
Year of birth missing
Year of death missing
19th-century baseball players